Kurt Anders Larson (born 14 February 1958) is a Swedish rower. He competed at the 1980 Summer Olympics, 1984 Summer Olympics and the 1988 Summer Olympics.

References

External links
 
 
 

1958 births
Living people
Swedish male rowers
Olympic rowers of Sweden
Rowers at the 1980 Summer Olympics
Rowers at the 1984 Summer Olympics
Rowers at the 1988 Summer Olympics
Place of birth missing (living people)